Her Kind of Man is a 1946 American crime film noir directed by Frederick De Cordova, and starring Dane Clark, Janis Paige and Zachary Scott. The film is not to be confused with His Kind of Woman (1951) starring Robert Mitchum and Jane Russell.

Plot
A nightclub singer, Georgia King, has been seeing Steve Maddux, a gambler. After another gambler, Felix Bender, ends up dead after a dispute between them, Steve goes to Miami, where club owner Joe Marino and wife Ruby welcome him. Steve agrees to work for Joe after losing $50,000 in a crooked card game.

Newspaper columnist Don Corwin and a cop, Bill Fellows, begin looking into Bender's death. Don falls for Georgia, even though Fellows warns him that she's been keeping company with a criminal. After an encounter between Don and Steve, a thug named Candy takes it upon himself to beat up Don, putting him in the hospital.

After causing Ruby to be killed by mistake, Steve makes an enemy of Joe, and they end up shooting one another. Steve dies in Georgia's arms.

Cast
 Dane Clark as Don Corwin
 Janis Paige as Georgia King
 Zachary Scott as Steve Maddux
 Faye Emerson as Ruby Marino
 George Tobias as Joe Marino
 Howard Smith as Bill Fellows
 Harry Lewis as Candy
 Sheldon Leonard as Felix Bender

Reception

Critical response
Film critic Bosley Crowther gave the film a lukewarm review, "There are gun fights, slugging matches and gambling sessions of the usual hard-boiled sort—and, except for a certain flair in dialogue, it is just another one of those things."

References

External links
 
 
 
 
 

1946 films
1946 crime drama films
American crime drama films
American black-and-white films
Film noir
Films directed by Frederick de Cordova
Films scored by Franz Waxman
Warner Bros. films
1940s English-language films
1940s American films